Marc Rosset was the defending champion but lost in the second round to Daniel Vacek.

Nicklas Kulti won in the final 6–7(5–7), 6–3, 6–4 against Yevgeny Kafelnikov.

Seeds
A champion seed is indicated in bold text while text in italics indicates the round in which that seed was eliminated.

Draw

Finals

Top half

Bottom half

References
 1996 Gerry Weber Open Draw

1996 Gerry Weber Open